Carl Vilhelm Oluf Peter Aarsleff (14 August 1852 – 4 January 1918) was a Danish sculptor.

Biography
Aarsleff was born in Nyborg on the island of Funen. He trained as a wood carver with his father before going to Copenhagen where he studied at the Royal Danish Academy of Fine Arts from 1872. He graduated from the Academy in 1876. At the same time working in the studios of Theobald Stein, Vilhelm Bissen and Jens Adolf Jerichau. In 1876, he won the Academy's small gold medal and in 1880, its large gold medal. In 1881, he went abroad on a travel grant to further his studies, visiting Paris, Italy and Greece.

In 1890 he became a member of the Academy Council. He was a professor at the Royal Danish Academy of Fine Arts from 1901 and from 1914 to 1917 served as its director.

Aarsleff's production of own works was relatively slow to get off the ground. He is best known for a number of statues and statuettes of young adults in a style influenced by Bertel Thorvaldsen and particularly by Jens Adolf Jerichau. He also made decorative works for several large architectural projects, including the Ny Carlsberg Glyptotek. From 1900 to 1912, he was engaged with the restoration of the sarcophagus of Margaret I of Denmark at Roskilde Cathedral.

He became a Knight of the Order of the Dannebrog in 1912. He died in Copenhagen and was buried at  Søllerød Kirkegård.

Legacy
Upon his death in 1918, 77 of his original works were donated to Nyborg.
They are today exhibited in an extension to Mads Lerches Gård, a building from 1601 which  houses the Østfyns Museer department of cultural history (Borgmestergården).

See also
 Art of Denmark

References

External links
Østfyns Museer website

1852 births
1918 deaths
People from Nyborg
Royal Danish Academy of Fine Arts alumni
Academic staff of the Royal Danish Academy of Fine Arts
Directors of the Royal Danish Academy of Fine Arts
20th-century Danish sculptors
Male sculptors
20th-century Danish male artists
19th-century Danish sculptors
Knights of the Order of the Dannebrog
19th-century Danish male artists